The Santos Museum of Economic Botany, located in the Adelaide Botanic Gardens, displays a permanent collection exhibiting the practical, medicinal and economic use of plant materials.

It was inspired by the museum in London's Kew Gardens, which opened in 1847, the Adelaide Museum opened in 1881 and is the sole remaining museum of its kind in Australia. Upon opening, the Museum of Economic Botany displayed 3500 objects specifically designed to show the link between the raw material and the final consumer product. It currently displays over 3000 specimens, representing 99% of collected material, and regularly hosts contemporary art exhibitions, such as Tamar Dean's photographic exhibition as part of the 2018 Adelaide Festival Biennial.

Instigated and developed by its first Director Richard Schomburgk, who drew on his international network of like-minded botanists to gather a wealth of content, the plant materials on display range from essential oils, gums and resins, fibre plants, dyes, food and beverage plants, fibres etc.

With its Greek-revival style facade, the Museum was listed on the now-defunct Register of the National Estate on 21 October 1980 and on the South Australian Heritage Register on 23 September 1982.

Criticism 

The climate activist group Extinction Rebellion has criticised an agreement struck between the Adelaide Botanic Garden and the fossil fuel company Santos in 2009, which saw part of a $2 million investment in the Garden gifted to the Museum and naming rights go to Santos until 2029. Extinction Rebellion have held numerous protests at the Museum to highlight the incongruity of a fossil fuel company sponsoring an institution dedicated to conservation and biodiversity, and to call on the Adelaide Botanic Garden to drop Santos as a sponsor and fully divest from the fossil fuel industry.

References

External links 

Museums in Adelaide
Natural history museums in Australia
1881 establishments in Australia
Adelaide Park Lands
South Australian places listed on the defunct Register of the National Estate
South Australian Heritage Register